Tom "Goatee" Brazill (1879 – 7 April 1946) was an Irish hurler who played as a left wing-forward for the Limerick senior team.

Born in Kilfinane, County Limerick, Brazill first played competitive hurling in his youth. He was a regular for the Limerick senior hurling team during a successful period at the end of the 19th century. During his inter-county career he won one All-Ireland medal and one Munster medal.

At club level Brazill was a two-time championship medallist with Kilfinane.

Honours

Player
Limerick
All-Ireland Senior Hurling Championship (1): 1897
Munster Senior Hurling Championship (1): 1897

References

1879 births
1946 deaths
Kilfinane hurlers
Limerick inter-county hurlers
All-Ireland Senior Hurling Championship winners